Cimlanod (development codes CXL-1427 and BMS-986231) is an experimental drug for the treatment of acute decompensated heart failure. It was discovered by Cardioxyl Pharmaceuticals, which was acquired by Bristol-Myers Squibb. It is a nitroxyl donor.

Cimlanod is a prodrug of CXL-1020.

A preliminary study showed efficacy in patients with class III and IV heart failure. A phase II clinical trial was completed in 2016.

References 

Experimental drugs
Furans
Sulfonamides